Nur Ahmed was a Bengali-Pakistani lawyer and politician.

Early life 
Ahmed was born on 25 December 1890 in Alkaran Mohalla, Chittagong, Chittagong District, Bengal Presidency, British India. Ahmed graduated from Chittagong Municipal Model High School and Chittagong College in 1910 and 1912 respectively. He completed his bachelors in Arabic and Persian languages and Masters in History from the University of Calcutta in 1915 and 1916 respectively. He received a law degree from the University of Calcutta in 1917.

Career 
Ahmed joined the Chittagong Judges Court after graduation. He was election Commissioner of Chittagong City in 1918 and chairperson in 1921, a position he held till 1954. As Chairperson of Chittagong, he introduced compulsory primary education, education for girls, and school inspectors. He oversaw a rise in the literacy rate of the city and increased the number of primary schools in the city to 62. He renovated the Municipal Public Library and installed electric street lights in Chittagong.

Ahmed was elected to the 1st National Assembly of Pakistan from East Pakistan as a Muslim League candidate in 1947. He motioned the bill in the national assembly that led to the creation of the Homeopathic Medical Board. He was a member of the Constituents Assembly of Pakistan.

Death 
Ahmed died on 2 October 1964 in Chittagong, East Pakistan, Pakistan. Alkaran Nur Ahmad City Corporation High School in Chittagong was named after him.

References 

Pakistani MNAs 1947–1954
People from Chittagong District
1890 births
1964 deaths
Mayors of Chattogram City Corporation
Members of the Constituent Assembly of Pakistan